In 1996, as part of its efforts to combat noise pollution and to protect and promote protection of the environment, the Ministry of the Environment designated the . There were 738 submissions received from all over the country and the 100 "best" were selected after examination by the Japan Soundscape Study Group. These soundscapes are intended to function as symbols for local people and to promote the rediscovery of the sounds of everyday life. The follow-up Sixth National Assembly on Soundscape Conservation was held in Matsuyama in 2002.

See also
 Soundscape ecology
 Ecoacoustics
 Biophony
 World Soundscape Project
 100 Landscapes of Japan (Heisei era)

References

External links
  Ministry of the Environment - 100 Soundscapes of Japan
  100 Soundscapes of Japan - List in English with map (6G)

Japanese culture
Environment of Japan
Lists of places in Japan
Japan
Articles containing video clips
1996 in Japan